Convolute may refer to:

 Convolute (botany)
 Convolute (manuscript), a volume containing several manuscripts
 Convolute (segment), along with gores, material segments used in pressure suit joints to allow for increased mobility
 Convolute laminations in geology
 Convoluted tubule, in anatomy
 Distal convoluted tubule

See also

 Convolution (disambiguation)